Leo Diogenes (Leōn Diogenes), styled as Porphyrogenitus, was the son of Byzantine Emperor Romanos IV Diogenes and Eudokia Makrembolitissa. Probably crowned co-emperor during his father's reign, he later served in the armies of Emperor Alexios I Komnenos. He does not appear on any of Romanos' coins, although there is at least one letter that refers to him as emperor (basileus). Anna Komnene notes that he and his brother Nikephoros both wore the diadem and tzangion (red sandals) usually reserved to emperors.

Life 
Leo's father, Romanos IV Diogenes, died while Leo was still an infant.  Although elevated to the rank of co-emperor on his birth, he was banished to a monastery along with his mother after the fall of Romanos. Here he remained until the accession of Alexios I Komnenos in 1081, who took in Leo and his brother Nikephoros and raised them like his own sons.

According to Anna Komnene’s account, Leo was a committed supporter of Alexios, who urged him not only to confront the Norman invaders early in his reign, but also the Pechenegs who had invaded the empire from beyond the Danube in 1087. During one of the pitched battles against the Pechenegs, Leo allowed himself to be drawn away from the emperor's side, and as he approached the wagons of the enemy, he was struck down and died on the field of battle.

References

Sources
 Komnene, Anna (1928) [1148]. The Alexiad. Translation by Elizabeth Dawes.

External links 

 Leo Diogenes' profile in the Prosopography of the Byzantine World.

Leo
11th-century Byzantine people
Byzantine generals
Doukid dynasty
Leo
1087 deaths
1069 births
Byzantine junior emperors
Sons of Byzantine emperors